Ian Campbell Thomas (born 23 July 1950) is a Canadian singer, songwriter, actor and author. He is the younger brother of comedian and actor Dave Thomas. He was born in Hamilton, Ontario, Canada.

Career
Thomas is a successful rock and roll musician in Canada. His solo career peaked during the 1970s; his most memorable hit was 1973's "Painted Ladies". Success in the American market, however, has proven to be elusive with the possible exception of "Painted Ladies", which remains his only U.S. Top 40 hit. He has also done musical composition for about a dozen films and television shows. Before breaking through with "Painted Ladies", he was a producer at the CBC. Before that, he was part of the folk music group Tranquility Base (sometimes spelled Tranquillity Base).

In 1974, he won a Juno Award for "Most Promising Male Vocalist of the Year". That year he toured in eastern Canada with April Wine. In 1976 he signed with Chrysalis Records.

In 1981, Thomas made a cameo appearance on SCTV with his real-life older brother Dave Thomas during a sketch of "The Great White North". He played himself and performed the songs, "Pilot" and "Hold On". He also wrote and recorded the theme song for his brother's film Strange Brew. As well, Thomas was a musical guest on the CTV children's show Whatever Turns You On (a short-lived spinoff of You Can't Do That on Television) in 1979.

Many of his songs have been covered by popular artists, including  "Hold On" (Santana, 1982), "Chains" (Chicago, 1982), "The Runner" (Manfred Mann's Earth Band, 1984), and "Right Before Your Eyes" (America, 1983). In 1988, Daryl Braithwaite had hits in Australia with two Thomas compositions: "As the Days Go By" (which peaked at #10), and "All I Do" (a #12 chart hit). Bette Midler also covered his song "To Comfort You" on her Bette of Roses album.

He is also known for the portrayal of the character "Dougie Franklin" on the Canadian comedy series The Red Green Show.

From 1991 through 2002, Thomas released four albums with The Boomers.

In 2009, Thomas provided the music for the animated series Bob & Doug, based on the SCTV characters of the same name.

He has written two books, Bequest (2006), Canadian Best Seller, and The Lost Chord (2008), both through Manor House Publishing.

In 2010, Wounded Bird Records re-issued "Still Here" on CD.

On 16 June 2014, Thomas was awarded the National Achievement Award by SOCAN at the 2014 SOCAN Awards in Toronto.

In 2015, he performed with Darcy Hepner and the Hamilton Philharmonic Orchestra, and recorded with them for a CD.

During the summer of 2016, Thomas was touring Ontario, Canada, with singers Murray McLauchlan, Cindy Church, and Marc Jordan, in the group Lunch at Allen's. The tour was continuing in late 2018 with a series of dates in Ontario.

Thomas is a member of the Canadian charity Artists Against Racism.

Discography

Singles

With Tranquility Base (1970–71)

Ian Thomas solo career (1973–2016)

With The Boomers (1991–2002)

With Lunch at Allen's (2004–present)

Solo albums
 1973 - Ian Thomas; #30 CAN  (10 weeks in Top 100)
 1974 - Long Long Way
 1975 - Delights
 1976 - Calabash (aka Goodnight Mrs. Calabash) (as Ian Thomas Band); #62 CAN  (20 weeks in Top 100)
 1978 - Still Here (as Ian Thomas Band); #60 CAN  (10 weeks in Top 100)
 1979 - Glider (as Ian Thomas Band); #77 CAN  (8 weeks in Top 100)
 1980 - The Best of Ian Thomas
 1981 - The Runner
 1984 - Riders on Dark Horses; #91 CAN  (6 weeks in Top 100)
 1985 - Add Water
 1988 - Levity; #74 CAN  (6 weeks in Top 100)
 1993 - Looking Back
 2012 - Little Dreams
 2016 - A Life in Song

Albums with The Boomers

 1991 - What We Do
 1993 - Art of Living
 1996 - 25 Thousand Days
 2002 - Midway

Albums with Lunch at Allen's
 2004 - Lunch at Allen's
 2007 - Catch the Moon
 2010 - More Lunch at Allen's
 2012 - Zuzu's Petals
 2017 - If It Feels Right

Comedy Album with the Air Pirates
 1990 - Volume Two

References

External links
Official Website
CanConRox entry

 
  as 'Tranquillity Base'
Lunch At Allen's

1950 births
Living people
Canadian rock singers
Canadian singer-songwriters
Musicians from Hamilton, Ontario
Juno Award for Breakthrough Artist of the Year winners
Anthem Records artists
Canadian people of Welsh descent
Chrysalis Records artists
Atlantic Records artists